God Went Surfing with the Devil is a 2010 surfing documentary  directed by Alexander Klein that follows the story of a group of activists who are trying to get a shipment of 23 surfboards into the Gaza strip. The group is met with several problems, including the border of Gaza being sealed by Israel. The DVD was released in the US on May 24, 2011 and shortly thereafter was distributed on Netflix.

See also 
 Gaza Surf Club, a related documentary film

External links
Official website

References

2010 films
2010 documentary films
American sports documentary films
Documentary films about surfing
Surfing in the Gaza Strip
Films set in the Gaza Strip
American surfing films
2010s English-language films
2010s American films